Avgi is a village of the Lagkadas municipality, northern Greece. Before the 2011 local government reform it was part of the municipality of Sochos. The 2011 census recorded 319 inhabitants in the village. Avgi is a part of the community of Kryoneri.

See also
 List of settlements in the Thessaloniki regional unit

References

Populated places in Thessaloniki (regional unit)